Gerard Ghibaudo is an electrical engineer with IMEP-LAHC, part of the Grenoble Institute of Technology in Grenoble, France. He was named a Fellow of the Institute of Electrical and Electronics Engineers (IEEE) in 2013 for his contributions to electron device characterization and modeling.

References

Fellow Members of the IEEE
Living people
Year of birth missing (living people)
Place of birth missing (living people)